Friendship, Loyalty, Commitment is the debut studio album by American heavy hardcore band 25 ta Life, released on July 6, 1999. The album features a Warzone cover song "As One" and special appearances by Jamey Jasta of Hatebreed, Roger Miret and Vinnie Stigma of Agnostic Front, Jimmy Gestapo from Murphy's Law, Paul Bearer from Sheer Terror, and more. The song "Over the Years" was featured on the Tony Hawk's Underground 2 soundtrack.

Track listing
 "Let the Past Be the Past"
 "Pain Is Temporary"
 "Hardcore Rules"
 "Backfire"
 "Positive Hardcore, Go!"
 "Friendship, Loyalty, Commitment"
 "The Next Level"
 "Bullet for Every Enemy"
 "Over the Years"
 "Refocus"
 "Wise to da Game"
 "Da Lowdown"
 "Short Fuse"
 "As One" (Warzone cover)
 "Smakin' You Up"

Credits
Rick Healey – vocals
Fred Mesk – guitar
Dave Urban – bass
Rob Pallotta – drums
Joe Hogan – engineering, mixing
Alan Douches – mastering
Kentax – artwork
Produced by 25 ta Life and Joe Hogan
Additional personnel: Jamey Jasta, Jimmy Gestapo, Roger Miret, Vinnie Stigma, Paul Bearer

1999 albums
Triple Crown Records albums
Good Life Recordings albums